Michelle Ongkingco (born March 4, 1978) is an American actress, best known for her recurring role as Olivia in Gilmore Girls.

Life and work 
Ongkingco first appeared in an episode of the US comedy series Kelly Kelly in 1998, and in the US television series Beverly Hills, 90210 in 1999, followed by other guest rules in Boston Public, Kate Basher, Hollywood 7, Judging Amy, Grey's Anatomy, The O.C., Brothers & Sisters and Ghost Whisperer. She also played Trudi in eight episodes of the fourth season of the American anthology series Undressed.,  Ongkingo also appeared in This is How the World Ends, a 2000 television film, and in the 2009 comedy Mrs. Washington Goes to Smith alongside Cybill Shepherd. Her probably best known role is the recurring character Olivia in the seventh season of the US comedy series Gilmore Girls in 2006 and 2007.

Ongkingco also appeared in L.A. Theatre Works's 2008 play Boats on a River by Julie Marie Myatt.

Filmography

Television

References

External links 

 
 

1978 births
Living people
21st-century American actresses
Actresses from New York City
American film actresses
American television actresses
Artists from Brooklyn